is a Japanese former cyclist. He competed in the sprint event at the 1988 Summer Olympics. He won the gold medal in the men's sprint at the 1990 Asian Games. He later became a professional keirin cyclist, accumulating more than 300 wins.

References

External links
 

1969 births
Living people
Japanese male cyclists
Olympic cyclists of Japan
Cyclists at the 1988 Summer Olympics
Sportspeople from Shiga Prefecture
Asian Games medalists in cycling
Asian Games gold medalists for Japan
Cyclists at the 1990 Asian Games
Keirin cyclists
Medalists at the 1990 Asian Games
20th-century Japanese people